James P. "Phil" Wisecup (born 1954 in Piqua, Ohio) is a retired United States Navy vice admiral, who last served as the 38th Naval Inspector General. Prior to that, he served as the president of the Naval War College. Since October 2013, he has been director of the Chief of Naval Operations Strategic Studies Group.

Family and education
The son of James and Bettye Ruth Bach Wisecup, Phil Wisecup is a 1973 graduate of Piqua High School and a 1977 graduate of the United States Naval Academy. He earned his master's degree in international relations from the University of Southern California; graduated from the Naval War College in Newport, Rhode Island, in 1998; and, as an Olmsted Scholar, earned a degree from the University of Strasbourg, France, in 1982. He married Ann, daughter of François-Georges Dreyfus, professor of history and political science at the University of Strasbourg and the University of Paris IV. Admiral Wisecup and his wife have five children.

Naval career

At sea, Wisecup served as executive officer of the guided-missile cruiser  during Operation Desert Storm. As commanding officer of the guided-missile destroyer , he was awarded the Vice Admiral James Bond Stockdale Award for Inspirational Leadership in 1996. He served as Commander, Destroyer Squadron 21 during Operation Enduring Freedom after the terrorist attacks of 11 September 2001.

Ashore, Wisecup was assigned to North Atlantic Treaty Organization (NATO) Headquarters in Brussels, Belgium, served as force planner and ship scheduler for Commander, Naval Surface Forces Pacific, and served as action officer for Navy Headquarters Plans/Policy Staff. He served as a fellow on the Chief of Naval Operations Strategic Studies Group; was Director, White House Situation Room; and served as Commander Naval Forces Korea from 2005 to 2007. He then served as Commander, Carrier Strike Group Seven (the  Strike Group) from 2007 to 2008. Promoted to rear admiral (upper half), he served as the 52nd president of the U.S. Naval War College from November 2008 until April 2011. In April 2011, he was promoted to vice admiral and became the 38th Naval Inspector General.

Wisecup was President of the Naval War College from 6 November 2008 to 30 March 2011. He became Naval Inspector General on 18 April 2011 and served in that post through September 2013, when he retired from active duty.

Later career
Upon retirement from active duty as a vice admiral in 2013, he returned to Newport, Rhode Island, where he became the 7th Director of the Chief of Naval Operations Strategic Studies Group.

Awards and decorations

Wisecup's awards and decorations include: 
  Navy Distinguished Service Medal
  Defense Superior Service Medal
  Legion of Merit
  Bronze Star Medal
  Defense Meritorious Service Medal
  Meritorious Service Medal with three stars.
  Navy and Marine Corps Commendation Medal with two stars.
  Navy and Marine Corps Achievement Medal
  Combat Action Ribbon
  Navy Unit Commendation

See also

References
This article includes public domain text produced by the United States Navy.

External links
 Official U.S. Navy biography 

1954 births
Living people
People from Piqua, Ohio
United States Naval Academy alumni
University of Strasbourg alumni
USC School of International Relations alumni
Recipients of the Vice Admiral James Bond Stockdale Award for Inspirational Leadership
Naval War College alumni
United States Navy admirals
Presidents of the Naval War College
United States Navy Inspectors General
Recipients of the Legion of Merit
Recipients of the Defense Superior Service Medal
Recipients of the Navy Distinguished Service Medal